Light middleweight, also known as junior middleweight or super welterweight, is a weight class in combat sports.

Boxing
The light middleweight division (also known as junior middleweight in the IBF or super welterweight in the WBA and WBC), is a weight division in professional boxing, above 66.7 kg and up to 69.9 kg (147–154 pounds).

History
This division was established in 1962, when the Austrian Board of Control recognized a fight between Emile Griffith and Teddy Wright for the "world" championship. The fight, which took place on October 17, was won by Griffith via a 15-round decision. Three days later, the World Boxing Association championship was created when Denny Moyer outpointed Joey Giambra. The World Boxing Council recognized the WBA champion as the true division champion until 1975, when it stripped their current champion and sanctioned a fight between Miguel de Oliveira and Jose Duran for the vacant title. De Oliveira won the title over 15 rounds in 1975. The International Boxing Federation crowned its first champion when Mark Medal defeated Earl Hargrove in 1984.  The World Boxing Organization crowned its first champion when John David Jackson defeated Lupe Aquino in 1988.

Popular boxers to have held championships in this division were Nino Benvenuti, Manny Pacquiao, Wilfred Benítez, Sugar Ray Leonard, Miguel Cotto, Thomas Hearns, Mike McCallum, Julian Jackson, Roberto Durán, Terry Norris, Oscar De La Hoya, Floyd Mayweather Jr., Zab Judah and Winky Wright.

Current world champions

Male champions

Current interim champions

Female champions

Current world rankings

The Ring
.

Keys:
 Current The Ring world champion

BoxRec

.

Kickboxing
In the International Kickboxing Federation (IKF), Super Welterweight is 147.1 - 153 lb (66.9 - 69.5 kg) & Light Middleweight is 153.1 - 159 lb (69.6 - 72.3 kg).

Lethwei
In World Lethwei Championship, Sasha Moisa is the Light middleweight Champion.

References and notes

External links
 http://www.ffboxe.com/

Boxing weight classes
Kickboxing weight classes